Tamunodouye, or Douye, is a Nigerian unisex given name, which originates from Ijaw. The name is most commonly used among the Kalabari, Okrika, and Nembe people of Rivers State, Bayelsa State, and the Egbema and Gbaramatu Ijaws Delta State. The name means;  "God's will", "God's desire", "favor from God", or "God's plan" in English.

The name may refer to:

Tonye Briggs-Oniyide, Rivers State Culture and Tourism Commissioner
Tonye Cole (born 1967), businessman
Tonye Garrick, British-born Nigerian singer
Alabo Tonye Graham-Douglas (born 1939), Nigerian politician
Tonye Ibiama (born 1974), Nigerian businessman
Tonye Patano (born 1961), American actress
Prince Tonye Princewill (born 1969), Nigerian politician

References

Kalabari-language given names
Nigerian names